Peace River C is a regional district electoral area in the Peace River Regional District in northeastern British Columbia, Canada. The electoral covers the area around Fort St. John.  It has no administrative or governmental function and is only used to select a rural representative to the regional district board.

According to the Canada 2001 Census:
Population: 5,830 (exclusive of any residents of Indian Reserves)
% Change (1996-2001): 11.0
Dwellings: 2,091
Area (km²): 583.56
Density (persons per km²): 10.0

Communities
Baldonnel
Charlie Lake
Pineview
Two Rivers

Regional district electoral areas in British Columbia
Peace River Regional District